The Pontifical Commission for Vatican City State is the legislative body of Vatican City. It consists of a president, who also holds the title of President of the Governorate of Vatican City State, and six other cardinals appointed by the pope for five-year terms.

The Pontifical Commission was created in 1939 by Pius XII. Laws and regulations proposed by the Commission must be submitted to the pope through the Secretariat of State prior to being made public and taking effect. Laws, regulations, and instructions enacted by the Commission are published in the Acta Apostolicae Sedis.

Current members

Current
As of 2022, the president and the members are:

President 
In addition to his legislative role, the President of the Governorate of Vatican City State, who since 1 October 2021 has been Archbishop Fernando Vérgez Alzaga, has been delegated executive authority by the pope for Vatican City, as the president of the Governorate of Vatican City State. As a senior member of the Roman Curia, the president is usually a cardinal of the Catholic Church.

During a sede vacante, the term of the president ends, as do most other offices in the Curia. However, the holder of the office prior to the death or resignation of the pope becomes a member of the Commission that handles some of the functions of the head of state until a new pope can be chosen, along with the former Cardinal Secretary of State and the Chamberlain of the Holy Roman Church.

Governor of the Vatican City State

Presidents of the Governorate of Vatican City State

Governorate of Vatican City State 

The President of the Pontifical Commission for Vatican City State also serves as the head of government of Vatican City, the president of the Governorate of Vatican City State, an office that is distinct from the former title of Governor of Vatican City. In addition to his legislative role, the President is delegated executive authority for Vatican City by the Pope. Administrations and departments of Vatican City's government, including the Corpo della Gendarmeria, the Vatican Observatory, the Vatican Museums, and the Department of Pontifical Villas, which administers Castel Gandolfo, report to the Governorate.

The functions of the Governorate include:
 Legal office
 Office for Personnel
 Office for Civil Records
 Archives
 Accounting Office
 Numismatic and Philatelic office
 Post and Telegraph office
 Shipping office
 Police Department (Corps of Gendarmerie of Vatican City)
 Tourist Information Office
 Department of Museums and Galleries (Vatican Museums)
 Department of Economic Services
 Department of Technical Services
Vatican Observatory
Castel Gandolfo
 Office for Archeological Research

See also
Index of Vatican City-related articles
Politics of Vatican City
Pontifical Commission

References

External links 
Vatican City State
GCatholic.org

 
Vatican City
Vatican City
Religion and politics